The 2010–11 Turkish Ice Hockey Super League season was the 19th season of the Turkish Ice Hockey Super League, the top level of ice hockey in Turkey. Six teams participated in the league.

Qualification round

Final round

External links 
 Turkish Ice Hockey Federation

TBHSL
Turkish Ice Hockey Super League seasons
TBHSL